The Women's 200m Backstroke event at the 10th FINA World Aquatics Championships swam on 25–26 July 2003 in Barcelona, Spain. Preliminary heats swam during the morning session on July 25, with the top-16 finishers advancing to Semifinals that evening. The top-8 finishers then advanced to swim again in the Final the next evening.

At the start of the event, the World (WR) and Championship (CR) records were:
WR: 2:06.62 swum by Krisztina Egerszegi (Hungary) on August 25, 1991 in Athens, Greece.
CR: 2:07.40 swum by Cihong He (China) on September 11, 1994 in Rome, Italy

Results

Final

Semifinals

Preliminaries

References

Swimming at the 2003 World Aquatics Championships
2003 in women's swimming